University of Medical Sciences, Ondo (UNIMED) is a university of medical sciences in Ondo City, Nigeria, owned by the Ondo State Government, established in 2015. It is the third specialized medical university in Africa and Nigeria's first specialized medical university to be accredited by the National Universities Commission.

The pioneer substantive vice chancellor of the university is Professor Friday Okonofua, a Nigerian professor of gynecology and the founder of Women Health and Action Research Centre, a non-profit and charitable organization headquartered in Benin City, which focuses on promoting female reproductive research.

History
The establishment of the university was as a result of the bill signed into law in 2014 by Olusegun Mimiko, the executive governor of Ondo State, to establish a state university of medical sciences. The bill was proposed by the Ondo State House of Assembly under the Schedule 1, Section 5(2), and Article 39(1) of Ondo State Laws. The university's first substantive Chancellor, Professor Friday Okonofua, was appointed on March 11, 2015, following the approval of the university by the National University Commission, NUC. The current Vice chancellor of the university is Professor Adesegun Fatusi

Faculty
The university consists of seven faculties:

Faculty of Sciences
Faculty of Basic Medical Sciences
Faculty of Basic Clinical Sciences
Faculty of Clinical Sciences
Faculty of Dental Sciences
Faculty of Nursing Sciences
Faculty of Allied Health Sciences
Faculty of Medical Rehabilitation

Faculty of Sciences
Departments under Faculty of Sciences are

Biosciences and Biotechnology
   Animal Science and Environmental Biology, 
   Environmental Management and Toxicology,
   Plant Biology, Environmental Control and Toxicology

Microbiology
Physics (Physics Electronics)
Chemistry
Food Science 
Science Laboratory Technology
Mathematics
Computer Science

Faculty Basic Medical Sciences
Departments are listed below;

Anatomy
Biochemistry
Physiology

Faculty of Basic Clinical Sciences
Departments are listed below

Anatomic Pathology
 Morbid Anatomy,
 Histopathology.
Chemical Pathology
Haematology
Microbial Pathology 
 Medical Microbiology, 
 Parasitological.
Pharmacology and Therapeutics.

Faculty of Clinical Sciences 

Departments are listed below
Community Medicine
Internal Medicine
Obstetrics and Gynecology
Paediatrics & Child Health
Radiology
Surgery

Faculty of Dental Science
Departments are listed below

Child Dental Health
Oral and Maxillofacial Surgery
Oral/Maxillofacial Pathology, Radiology and Oral Medicine
Preventive and Community Dentistry
Restorative Dentistry

Faculty of Pharmacy and Pharmaceutical Sciences
Pharmaceutical Chemistry
Pharmaceutics and Pharmaceutical Technology
Pharmaceutical Microbiology
Pharmacology
Clinical Pharmacy and Biopharmacy
Pharmacognosy

Faculty of Public Health
Epidemiology and Biostatistics
Environmental and Occupational Health
Public Health Nutrition
Health Economics and Health Management
Women's Studies and Reproductive Health
Demography
Health Informatics
Health Education and Primary Health Care
Faculty of Medical Rehabilitation

 Physiotherapy 
 Occupational Therapy
 Prosthetic and Orthotics 
 Speech Therapy
 Audiology

See also
List of tertiary institutions in Ondo State

References

Educational institutions established in 2015
2015 establishments in Nigeria
Ondo City
University of Medical Sciences, Ondo
Medical schools in Nigeria
Universities and colleges in Ondo State